The Changpi Lake is a lake in Sanxing Township, Yilan County, Taiwan.

History
The lake used to be cavalry stable area for the Imperial Japanese Army during the Japanese rule of Taiwan.

Geography
Changpi Lake is located at an altitude of about 190 meters. The major land forms around the land include the subtropical forest that surrounds it. The lake has water all year round but it changes levels according to the seasons. The lake area is equipped with various recreational facilities such as camping area, barbecue area, playground, trails etc.

See also
 Geography of Taiwan

References

Lakes of Yilan County, Taiwan